Émile-Aubert Lessore or Lessorre (1805 in Paris – 1876 in Marlotte) was a French ceramic artist and painter.

Life
He originally worked in oil and water colors, but expanded into ceramic art. His ceramics work received a variety of medals, including his 1862 exhibition in London, 1867 exhibition in Paris, and 1873 exhibit in  Vienna. Known for his subdued and delicate coloring, Lessore is said to have led a revolution in the decoration of pottery.

Emile painted a variety of ceramic pieces, many for the Wedgwood pottery company.  Some scenes painted on the ceramic pieces are from other works.

Lessore first studied under Jean Auguste Dominique Ingres, which led to his first exhibit in the Paris Salon at age 26. At that time, it was unusual for someone so young to have a painting exhibit in official art exhibition  of the Académie des Beaux-Arts. Over the next twenty years, his paintings sold well.  In 1835 he published, with William Wyld, Voyage pittoresque dans la Régence d’Alger (Paris, Charles Motte, 1835).

In 1851, Lessore began his ceramics work in Sèvres, a southwestern suburb of Paris, France known for its porcelain manufacture. Lessore tapped into his artistic painting experience to produce a pair of large, decorated vases. These were purchased in 1853 by the Emperor of Russia for 1,000 guineas ($5,145).

Lessore's unique artistic expression did not fit well with the techniques of the other artists in Sèvres and by 1858 Lessore had moved to England to work for English potter Thomas Minton. Lessore then moved to Etruria, Staffordshire, where he worked for the famous firm of Wedgwood. Lessore exhibits were well received and he received personal exhibition medals in London (1862), Paris (1867), and Vienna (1873).

 
At age 68, Lessore moved back to Paris to continue his work with ceramics in Fontainebleau but maintained contact with Wedgwood. Lessore died in 1876 at the age of 71.

References 

 Le journal des Goncourt,  Vol IV,  page 135;
 Explication des ouvrages de peinture, sculpture, architecture, gravure et... du Salon de la Société des Artistes Français
 Lynne Thornton: Les Orientalistes;
 L'Écho de la Fabrique, Le Salon de 1833,  N°30 du 28 Juillet;
 André Roussard :  Dictionnaire des peintres à Montmartre au XIXe et XXe siècle,  Montmartre 1999;
 Olivier Fanica:   Un céramiste à découvrir: Lessore ;  Les Amis de Bourbon-Marlotte;  été 1983 N°13;
 
 Emile Lessore and William Wyld : " Voyage pittoresque dans la régence d'Alger" reissue of the architect Fernand Pouillon éditeur Jardin de Flore Paris 1973;

External links
 École à Alger
 Akoun
  Artprice
 RMN Réunion des Musées Nationaux

19th-century French painters
French male painters
French ceramists
1805 births
1876 deaths
19th-century French male artists